A number of aircraft have been claimed to be the fastest propeller-driven aircraft. This article presents the current record holders for several sub-classes of propeller-driven aircraft that hold recognized, documented speed records in level flight. Fédération Aéronautique Internationale (FAI) records are the basis for this article. Other contenders and their claims are discussed, but only those made under controlled conditions and measured by outside observers. Pilots during World War II sometimes claimed to have reached supersonic speeds in propeller-driven fighters during emergency dives, but these speeds are not included as accepted records. Neither are speeds recorded in a dive during high-speed tests with the Supermarine Spitfire, including Squadron Leader J.R. Tobin's  in a 45° dive in a Mark XI Spitfire (date unknown) and Squadron Leader Anthony F. Martindale's breaking  in the same aircraft in April 1944. Flight Lieutenant Edward Powles'  in Spitfire PR.XIX PS852 during an emergency dive while carrying out spying flights over China on 5 February 1952 is also discounted. This would otherwise be the highest speed ever recorded for a piston-engined aircraft.

Propeller versus jet propulsion

Aircraft that use propellers as their prime propulsion device constitute a historically important subset of aircraft, despite inherent limitations to their speed. Aircraft powered by piston engines get virtually all of their thrust from the propeller driven by the engine. A few piston engined aircraft derive some thrust from the engine's exhaust gases, and there are certain hybrid types like the Motorjet that use a piston engine to drive the compressor of a jet engine, which supplies the primary thrust (although some types also have a propeller powered by the piston engine for low speed efficiency). All aircraft prior to World War II (except for a tiny number of early jet aircraft and rocket aircraft) used piston engines to drive propellers, so all Flight airspeed records prior to 1944 were necessarily set by propeller-driven aircraft. Rapid advances in first liquid-fueled rocket engine-powered aircraft – with a  record set in October 1941 by a German example — and axial-flow jet engine technology during World War II meant that no propeller-driven aircraft would ever again hold an absolute air speed record. Shock wave formation in propeller-driven aircraft at speeds near sonic conditions, impose limits not encountered in jet aircraft.

Jet engines, particularly turbojets, are a type of gas turbine configured such that most of the work available results from the thrust of the hot exhaust gases. Turbofans, both the high-bypass versions used in all modern commercial jetliners, and the low-bypass versions in most modern military aircraft, produce a combination of jet thrust from the exhaust of burnt fuel, and air thrust from what amounts to an internal propeller. High-bypass turbofan engines achieve most of their thrust from a fan driving air backwards through the engine casing, and driven by a gas turbine, which also contributes jet thrust via its exhaust. The two are in one large engine casing with the fan (propeller) at the front and the jet engine behind, with both turbine exhaust and fan-driven air exiting the rear of the engine casing.  Turboprop engines are similar, but use an external propeller rather than an internal fan (propeller) inside an engine casing. The hot exhaust gas from a turboprop engine gives a small amount of thrust, however the propeller is the main source of thrust.

Turboprops
The Soviet Tu-95 bomber is able to reach  in level flight,  but no official FAI record has been recognized. The FAI lists a Piaggio P.180 Avanti as the fastest propeller-driven aircraft with speed of  “over a recognized course”, in this case Fort Worth to Atlanta, set on 6 Feb 2003 by Joseph J. Ritchie.

Probably the fastest aircraft ever fitted with an operating propeller was the experimental McDonnell XF-88B, which was made by installing an Allison T38 turboshaft engine in the nose of a pure jet-powered XF-88 Voodoo. This unusual aircraft was intended to explore the use of high-speed propellers and achieved supersonic speeds. This aircraft exceeded the speed of sound (Mach 1.2) on the propeller alone, but only in a dive, and it wasn't in two directions, which is necessary for the FAI's record book.

An oft-cited contender for the fastest propeller-driven aircraft is the XF-84H Thunderscreech. While it may have been designed as the fastest propeller-driven aircraft, this goal was not realized due to severe stability problems.

Piston engines

The more "traditional" class of propeller-driven aircraft comprises those powered by piston engines, which include nearly all aircraft from the Wright brothers up through World War II. Today piston engines are used almost exclusively on light, general aviation aircraft. This record was retired as a new weight class based system was introduced to allow more pilots to set new records across a wider range of aircraft. This record is also the fastest for any propeller driven piston aircraft.

Other claimants

The 1903 Wright Flyer did  during its first flight; the Bleriot XI reached  in 1909.

The Messerschmitt Me 209 V1 set a world speed record of almost  on 26 April 1939, and the Republic XP-47J (a variant of the P-47 Thunderbolt) is claimed to have reached . A P-51H Mustang managed . A prototype Republic XP-72, designed as a successor to the P-47, managed . The prototype of the twin-engined de Havilland Hornet (RR915) (383 built) reached  as did a prototype Hawker Fury monoplane when fitted with a Napier Sabre VII, and a prototype of the successor to the Supermarine Spitfire, the Supermarine Spiteful, reached .

In the 1950s two turboprop tailsitter fighter prototypes were designed for the US Navy, the Convair XFY "Pogo" and the Lockheed XFV, but both had less powerful engines than intended and conflicting demands of vertical and horizontal flight further compromised flight speeds so they never got close to these numbers.

See also
 Flight airspeed record
 List of vehicle speed records
 Transcontinental flight
 List of slowest fixed-wing aircraft

References

Notes

Bibliography

 Darling, Kev. Griffon Powered Spitfires (Warbird Tech Series). North Branch, Minnesota: Specialty Press, 2001. .
 Green, William. Warplanes of the Third Reich. London: McDonald and Jane's Publishers Ltd, 1970. .
 Gross, Nigel et al. Speed and Power: 100 Years of Change. North Vancouver, British Columbia, Canada: Whitecap Books, 1998. .
 Hendrix, Lin. "Thunderscreech." Aeroplane Monthly Vol. 5, Issue 8, August 1977.
 Taylor, John W.R. and Kenneth Munson. History of Aviation. London: Octopus Books, 1973. .
 Young, Mark C., ed. The Guinness Book of Records 1997. North Salem, New York: Mint Publishers Group, 1997. .

Aviation records